Carmelita Airport  is an airstrip serving Carmelita, a small community in the Maya Biosphere Reserve of Guatemala. A section of the runway also serves as a street in the village.

Google Earth Historical Imagery (3/18/2015) shows trees that formerly impinged the runway in a previous image (12/9/2012) have been removed.

See also

Transport in Guatemala
List of airports in Guatemala

References

External links
 OpenStreetMap - Carmelita Airport
 OurAirports - Carmelita
 Panoramio Aerial Photo
 

Airports in Guatemala
Petén Department